The phrase Virgins of Galindo refers to three sisters (aged 7–16) who were slaughtered, and then raped and dismembered just after the assassination of their father, at the Galindo Manor, located outside the city walls of Santo Domingo, several weeks after the annexation of Santo Domingo by Haiti in 1822.

Contrary to the belief among the Dominican society (specially among poets, historians, school curricula) that these crimes are attributed to Haitian occupation soldiers, some archives suggest that these crimes were not committed by Haitian officers, but by civilian men from both sides of the island (i. e., Haitians and Dominicans).

Family members 
The Andújar family was of Canarian descent, and native to Hincha in the Spanish colony of Santo Domingo. After the Haitian invasions of 1801 and 1805 they settled on the outskirts of Santo Domingo.

 Father: Andrés Antonio Andújar de Soto (he was brother-in-law to both President Buenaventura Báez and José de Guzmán y Meléndez, viscount of San Rafael de La Angostura and lord of San Miguel de la Atalaya)
 Mother: María Manuela de Lara Pérez  (deceased prior 1822)
 "Virgins":
Ana María Clemente Andújar de Lara
Marcela Andújar de Lara
Águeda Andújar de Lara

References to the slaughter in Dominican literature 
 Cosas Añejas (Chapter: Las Vírgenes de Galindo), by César Nicolás Penson (1891)
 La Conspiración de los Alcarrizos, by Max Henríquez Ureña (1940)
 Centinela de la Frontera, by Joaquín Balaguer (1962)
 Yania Tierra, by Aída Cartagena Portalatín (1981)

References

1822 in the Caribbean
Massacres in the Dominican Republic
History of the Dominican Republic
History of Haiti
Dominican Republic–Haiti relations
Dominican Republic people of Canarian descent
White Dominicans